Portrait of a Murderer may refer to:

Portrait of a Murderer (novel), a 1933 novel by Anne Meredith
"Portrait of a Murderer" (Playhouse 90), a 1958 television play in the series Playhouse 90